
Deron Michael Bilous  (born October 7, 1975) is a Canadian politician, who has served as a Member of the Legislative Assembly of Alberta, representing the riding of Edmonton-Beverly-Clareview, since the 2012 provincial election. He is a member of the Alberta New Democratic Party caucus.

Bilous was NDP candidate in Edmonton-Centre in the 2008 provincial election, losing to Laurie Blakeman.

He was elected when he tried again in the 2012 provincial election.

He was re-elected in the 2015 election, which saw the NDP win a majority government. Bilous was named to the cabinet as Minister of Municipal Affairs and the Minister in Charge of Service Alberta on May 24, 2015.

On October 22, 2015, his position in cabinet changed to Minister of Economic Development and Trade. He also was named Deputy Government House Leader.

On April 16, 2019, Bilous was re-elected for his third term in the Legislative Assembly, although his party lost enough seats to no longer be in government. He is currently the Official Opposition Critic for Economic Development and Innovation.

Early life and outside interests 
Bilous was born and raised in Edmonton and is very proud of his Ukrainian ancestry. He graduated from the University of Alberta with a bachelor of education degree in 2001. For the past five years he has taught and mentored students at Edmonton's Inner City High School.

An active volunteer in his community, Bilous has been a member of the Beverly Heights Community League and vice-president of the Boyle Street Community League. From 2008 to 2011 he served as a board member on the Edmonton Aboriginal Urban Affairs Committee.

Bilous participated in the Canada World Youth program in 1995–96, working in Edmonton, Saint-Jérôme, Quebec, and Tunisia.

Electoral history

2019 general election

2015 general election

2012 general election

2008 general election

References

External links
Deron Bilous

1975 births
Living people
Alberta New Democratic Party MLAs
Members of the Executive Council of Alberta
Politicians from Edmonton
University of Alberta alumni
Canadian people of Ukrainian descent
21st-century Canadian politicians